Tatosoma apicipallida is a species of moth in the family Geometridae first described by Louis Beethoven Prout in 1914. It is endemic to New Zealand. The larval host plant of this species is unknown. It has been found from Mount Te Aroha southwards.

References

Trichopterygini
Moths described in 1914
Moths of New Zealand
Endemic fauna of New Zealand
Taxa named by Louis Beethoven Prout
Endemic moths of New Zealand